Peter Nyström (born 27 August 1984) is a Swedish footballer, who plays professionally as a midfielder. He lastly played for Varbergs BoIS.

Career
Peter Nyström started his career in Kungsladugårds BK, before moving to Västra Frölunda IF in 2001, then in Superettan. He stayed with the club until 2005, he chose not to follow Frölunda down to Division 1 as the club was relegated, he instead signed for Norwegian club Sogndal Fotball. His time in Norway was short as he in 2008 returned to Sweden and Superettan, this time however to BK Häcken. He helpt the club get promoted to Allsvenskan, but got his 2010 season ruined by a ruptured achilles tendon, with limited playing time during the 2011 season he decided to leave the club and join newly relegated Halmstads BK.

References

External links
Halmstads BK profil

1984 births
Living people
Swedish footballers
Association football midfielders
Västra Frölunda IF players
Sogndal Fotball players
BK Häcken players
Halmstads BK players
Allsvenskan players
Eliteserien players
Swedish expatriate footballers
Expatriate footballers in Norway
Swedish expatriate sportspeople in Norway